Signia can refer to more than one notable item:
 Signia (sportswear), an Argentine company.
 a MasterCard product issued by Coutts and Co
 a colony of ancient Rome, in Latium adiectum, today Segni
 a Signage Software Suite, developed by Jake Bown
 a hearing aid brand, manufactured by WS Audiology